The 1993 South Africa rugby union tour of Australia was a series of matches played by the Springboks in Australia during July and August 1993. It was the first tour of the South African team to Australia since the riots of controversial tour of 1971.

The test series was won by the Wallabies with two test wins to one.

Results 
Scores and results list South Africa's points tally first.

Reference list

1993 in Australian rugby union
1993 rugby union tours
1993
tour